Dictyopharidae is a family of planthoppers, related to the Fulgoridae. The family comprises nearly 760 species in more than 150 genera which are grouped into two subfamilies, Dictyopharinae and Orgeriinae.

Description

Like all other fulgoroids, they have the antennae arising on the side of the head below the compound eye (not between the eyes as in the Cicadoidea). Many species have an elongated frons. Those that do not have this elongation may have 2 or 3 carinae (keels). The median ocellus is absent.

Diversity
Genera are placed in two subfamilies:

Dictyopharinae
Authority: Onuki, 1901; selected genera include:
 Dictyophara Germar, 1833
 Dictyotenguna Song & Liang
 Miasa Distant, 1906
 Neodictya Synave, 1965
 Rhynchomitra Fennah, 1944
 Scolops Schaum, 1850
 Thanatodictya Kirkaldy, 1906

Orgeriinae

Authority: Fieber, 1872; the following genera, in four tribes, are included by BioLib.cz:

Almanini Kusnetzov, 1936
 Almana Stål, 1861
 Bursinia A. Costa, 1862
 Cnodalum Emeljanov, 1978
 Coppa Emeljanov, 1969
 Coppidius Emeljanov, 1969
 Haumavarga Oshanin, 1908
 Iphicara Emeljanov, 1978
 Mesorgerius Kusnezov, 1933
 Nymphorgerius Oshanin, 1913
 Orgamarella Emeljanov, 1969
 Parorgerioides Bergevin, 1928
 Scirtophaca Emeljanov, 1969
 Sphenarchus Emeljanov, 2003
 Tachorga Emeljanov, 1969
 Tigrahauda Oshanin, 1908
 Tilimontia Emeljanov, 1969
Colobocini Emeljanov, 1969
 Colobocus Emeljanov, 1969
Orgeriini Fieber, 1872
 Acinaca Ball & Hartzell, 1922
 Almanetta Emeljanov, 1999
 Aridia Ball & Hartzell, 1922
 Austrorgerius Woodward, 1960
 Deserta Ball & Hartzell, 1922
 Orgamara Ball, 1909
 Orgerius Stål, 1859
 Ticida Uhler, 1891
 Ticrania Emeljanov, 2006
 Timonidia Ball & Hartzell, 1922
 Yucanda Ball & Hartzell, 1922
 Kumlika Oshanin, 1912
 Ototettix Oshanin, 1912
Ranissini Emeljanov, 1969
 Elysiaca Emeljanov, 1969
 Parorgerius Melichar, 1912
 Phyllorgerius Kusnezov, 1928
 Ranissus Fieber, 1866
 Sphenocratus Horváth, 1910

Unplaced and fossil taxa
The following genera are incertae sedis:
 Mitropodes Baptista, Ferreira & Da-Silva, 2006
 Mozzela Baptista, Ferreira & Da-Silva, 2006

A number of species are known from the fossil record, which reaches back to the Santonian age of the Late Cretaceous.  The oldest fossil, Netutela  annunciator belonging to the extinct dictyopharine tribe Netutelini, was described from Taymyr amber on the Taymyr Peninsula of Russia. Younger amber fossils include the amber genus Alicodoxa described from Eocene Baltic and Rovno ambers Compression fossil species include the Ypresian Limfjordia breineri from the Fur Formation in Denmark and the Priabonian Florissantia elegans from the Florissant Formation, Colorado.

References

External links 
 

 
Auchenorrhyncha families
Fulgoromorpha